Lt. General Mahdi Sabeh Al-Gharrawi is an Iraqi police officer, the former Commander of the Iraqi Federal Police in Nineveh Province, and Lieutenant General of Iraqi Army.

Gharawi, along with several other military leaders, was dismissed from his position by Prime Minister Nouri al-Maliki on 17 June 2014 for failing in his "professional and military duty". His dismissal came a week after the fall of much of Northern Iraq to anti-government forces in the 2014 Northern Iraq offensive. He was sentenced to death by a military tribunal.

After serving two years in prison, Gharawi was released on 1 August 2020.

See also
Iraqi Security Forces
Iraq War
War on Terrorism

References

Iraqi generals
Year of birth uncertain
Living people
People of the War in Iraq (2013–2017)
Year of birth missing (living people)